Arley is a small village in the civil parish of Aston by Budworth, Cheshire, England, adjacent to Arley Hall.  to the east is a small group of houses known as Arley Green.

The buildings now comprising Arley Green originally formed Cowhouse Farm.  Rowland Egerton-Warburton converted the half-timbered barn into a school and adapted another 18th-century building into a terrace of Tudor-style buildings. The farmhouse was converted into a parsonage.

References

Villages in Cheshire